Arnold Anderson was a Six Nations Tuscarora tribal member who worked as a chemical engineer on the Manhattan Project to help the United States develop the first atomic bombs. He was president and founding member of the American Indian Science and Engineering Society which was founded in 1977 with six other American Indian scientists.

References

20th-century Native Americans
People from the County of Brant
American chemical engineers
Canadian chemical engineers
Manhattan Project people
Year of birth missing
Year of death missing
Place of birth missing